Dom Ignatios Firzli (April 25, 1913 – August 10, 1997), also known in Brazilian Portuguese as Ignatios Ferzli was a Melkite Greek Orthodox Christian priest and theologian who became Antiochian Metropolitan Bishop of Sao Paulo and head of the Greek Orthodox Church of Antioch for Brazil and South America.

He is also known as Father Ignatios of Sao Paulo in the Melkite Greek Orthodox Church of Antioch.

Life
Father Ignatios (or ‘Ignatius’) was born in Zahleh, Ottoman Syria (now Lebanon), on April 25, 1913. After graduating from the Byzantine Antiochian Patriarchal School of Theology of Damascus, he was ordained into the Greek Orthodox priesthood in 1933 for the Diocese of Alexandria, Kingdom of Egypt, then an autonomous part of the British Empire. He furthered his study of Byzantine Christian theology at the Patriarchical Halki seminary in Istanbul, Turkey, alongside his longtime friend father Parthenios Koinidis, who later became head of the Greek Orthodox Church of Egypt, Sudan and Africa under the name of Patriarch Parthenius III of Alexandria.

Father Ignatios graduated in 1939, at the start of the Second World War, and chose to return to Egypt, where he was raised to the rank of Grand Archimandrite (‘Senior Superior Abbott’) of the Greek Patriarchate of Alexandria and All Africa.

He was then appointed Metropolitan Bishop of Sao Paulo for the Greek Orthodox Church of Antioch, thus becoming the de facto head of the Syro-Lebanese Greek Orthodox diasporas of Brazil and South America. He famously said: “Everything went so that I would serve Orthodoxy on the throne of St. Mark [the Greek Church of Egypt, Sudan and Africa], when, to my great surprise, I was assigned to serve on the throne of St. Paul [the Greek Church of Southern Turkey, Syria, Lebanon and Northeastern Israel], and, all of a sudden, my personal mission was ‘diverted’ to Brazil".

Legacy
Dom Ignatios served as spiritual leader of the Syro-Lebanese Byzantine Christian communities of Brazil and South America throughout most of the Cold War, a particularly tense period characterized by social and political upheavals in Latin America.

He is remembered as a polyglot and polymath who could “speak and write fluently English, Russian, Portuguese, Spanish, French, Modern Greek, Classical Arabic, Turkish and Armenian” 

His personal assistant and sexton (or ‘Shammes’ in Ancient Hebrew and Levantine Arabic) who served for many years under Dom Ignatios at the Syro-Lebanese Greek-Orthodox Central Church of Sao Paulo (known as ‘Da Igreja Ortodoxa da Rua Vergueiro’) was Father Habib Haddad (‘Cury Habib’), paternal grandfather of Fernando Haddad, the mayor of Sao Paulo.

See also
Greek Orthodox Church of Antioch

References

1913 births
1997 deaths
20th-century Eastern Orthodox bishops
Members of the Greek Orthodox Church of Antioch
Greek Orthodox Christians from the Ottoman Empire
Greek Orthodox Christians from Lebanon
Greek Orthodox Christians from Egypt
People from São Paulo
People from Alexandria
Levantine-Egyptians
Eastern Orthodox Christians from Brazil
Theological School of Halki alumni